Magne Hoseth  (born Magne Hoset on 13 October 1980) is a Norwegian football coach and former footballer who played for Averøykameratene, Molde (two times), Copenhagen, Viking, Aalesund, Stabæk, Notodden and Kristiansund. On 21. November 2022 he was presented as manager of Faroese Champions KÍ - Klaksvík, leaving the job as assistant coach in Eliteserien club Kristiansund BK. As a footballer, Hoseth won a total of 6 trophies, featuring 4 Tippeligaen titles, one Norwegian Cup title and one Royal League title. From his debut in 2001, he has played 22 matches for the Norway national football team.

Career

Early career
Hoseth started his career in his local club IL Averøykameratene. In 1999 was he signed by Molde.

Molde
In his first season for the club from Romsdal he performed well both in the Tippeligaen and in the Champions League. His breakthrough came when he came in as a substitute and scored two goals against CSKA Moscow in the 1999–2000 UEFA Champions League 2nd qualifying round, second leg. He was also a regular in the Norwegian youth national team.

Copenhagen
In the summer of 2004 Hoseth was transferred to the Danish team F.C. Copenhagen. He was very popular in Copenhagen, and was named 2004 player of the year at the club, despite playing only four months that calendar year.  Because of his homesickness he wanted to go back to Norway and left the club in 2005.

Vålerenga
In June 2005 he was signed by Vålerenga from Oslo. He won the 2005 Tippeligaen while at the club.

Second spell at Molde

In July 2006 he returned to his old club Molde. Despite the team was relegated to 1. divisjon, Hoseth chose to stay in Molde. He became Tippeligaen champion in 2011, 2012 and 2014. With the club, Hoseth won the Norwegian Cup in 2013 after scoring defining goals both in the semifinal against Lillestrøm and later in the final against Molde's main rivals Rosenborg. Hoseth scored Molde's 3–2 goal in the final which ended 4–2. Hoseth made a total of 364 appearances for Molde, the third-highest number of appearances by any player for the club. With 84 top division goals, Hoseth is Molde's all-time top scorer in Eliteserien.

Later career
On 30 July 2014, Hoseth moved to Stabæk, signing a contract for the remainder of the 2014 season.

After short stays with Viking and Aalesund through the 2015 season, Hoseth signed a 2-year contract with 2. divisjon side Notodden before 2016. On 16 August 2017 he signed a contract with Kristiansund BK. In the club's first ever season in the top flight, Hoseth helped them stay up and finish seventh on the Eliteserien table. On 10 January Hoseth announced his retirement on Twitter.

International career
Hoseth made a total of 37 appearances and scored eleven goals for Norway at youth international level.

Hoseth made his senior debut for Norway on 25 April 2001, as a half-time substitute for Dan Eggen in a 2–1 home friendly win over Bulgaria. His only goal came on his 5th cap, on 24 January 2004, in a 3–1 win over Honduras in Hong Kong. His 22nd and last cap was on 25 September 2009, a 1–1 draw with Iceland in World Cup qualification.

Career statistics

Club
Source:

International
Source:

Honours
Copenhagen
 Royal League: 2004–05
Vålerenga
 Tippeligaen: 2005
Molde
 Tippeligaen: 2011, 2012, 2014
 Norwegian Cup: 2013

International goals

References

External links
Player profile on official club website 
National Caps   

UEFA profile

1980 births
Living people
People from Averøy
Norwegian footballers
Norway international footballers
Norway under-21 international footballers
Norway youth international footballers
Aalesunds FK players
F.C. Copenhagen players
Kristiansund BK players
Molde FK players
Notodden FK players
Stabæk Fotball players
Vålerenga Fotball players
Viking FK players
Eliteserien players
Danish Superliga players
Norwegian First Division players
Norwegian Second Division players
Norwegian expatriate footballers
Expatriate men's footballers in Denmark
Norwegian expatriate sportspeople in Denmark
Norwegian expatriate football managers
Association football midfielders
Sportspeople from Møre og Romsdal